The 2016 American Athletic Conference baseball tournament was held at Bright House Field in Clearwater, Florida, from May 24 through 29. The event, held at the end of the conference regular season, determined the champion of the American Athletic Conference for the 2016 season. The University of Connecticut won and received the conference's automatic bid to the 2016 NCAA Division I baseball tournament.

Format and seeding
All eight baseball teams in The American were seeded based on their records in conference play. The tournament used a two bracket double-elimination format, leading to a single championship game between the winners of each bracket.  South Florida claimed the seventh seed over UCF by virtue of owning the third tie-breaker (season series tied 3-3; both teams 0–3 versus Tulane; USF 2–1 versus East Carolina, UCF 0–3 versus East Carolina).

Bracket

All-Tournament Team
The following players were named to the All-Tournament Team.

References

Tournament
American Athletic Conference Baseball Tournament
Baseball competitions in Florida
American Athletic Conference baseball tournament
American Athletic Conference baseball tournament
College sports tournaments in Florida